Glen Cove is an unincorporated village within the town of Rockport in Knox County, Maine, United States. Glen Cove had a post office until it closed on December 20, 2003.

References

Villages in Knox County, Maine
Villages in Maine